The National Agency for Food and Drug Administration and Control (NAFDAC) in Nigeria is a federal agency under the Federal Ministry of Health that is responsible for regulating and controlling the manufacture, importation, exportation, advertisement, distribution, sale and use of food, drugs, cosmetics, medical devices, chemicals and packaged water.

The agent is headed by Dr. Monica Eimunjeze in acting capacity on November 12, 2022, according to an internal memo dated November 17, 2022, signed by Oboli A.U and copied to all Directors at the agency, follows the expiration of Prof Mojisola Adeyeye. She was appointed on 12 November 2022 by the President of Federal Republic of Nigeria as the acting Director-General of National Agency for Food and Drug Administration and Control (NAFDAC).

Formation 
The organization was established to counter illicit and counterfeit products in Nigeria in 1993 under the country's health and safety law. 
Adulterated and counterfeit drugs are a problem in Nigeria. In one 1989 incident, over 150 children died as a result of paracetamol syrup containing diethylene glycol. The problem of fake drugs was so severe that neighbouring countries such as Ghana and Sierra Leone officially banned the sale of drugs, foods and beverages products made in Nigeria.

Such problems led to the establishment of NAFDAC, with the goal of eliminating counterfeit pharmaceuticals, foods and beverages products that are not manufactured in Nigeria and ensuring that available medications are safe and effective.

The formation of NAFDAC was inspired by a 1988 World Health Assembly resolution requesting countries' help in combating the global health threat posed by counterfeit pharmaceuticals.

In December 1992, NAFDAC's first governing council was formed. The council was chaired by Tanimu Saulawa. In January 1993, supporting legislation was approved as legislative Decree No. 15 of 1993. On January 1, 1994 NAFDAC was officially established as a “parastatal of the Federal Ministry of Health”.

NAFDAC replaced an earlier Federal Ministry of Health body, the Directorate of Food and Drug Administration and Control, which had been deemed ineffective, partially because of lack of   laws, concerning fake drugs.

Administration

Chairman and council

“(NAFDAC) is headed by a chairman who presides over a governing council appointed by the president on the recommendation of the Minister of Health.”Other council members are: 
Chairman - Yusuf A. Suleiman (Dan Amar Sokoto)
The Permanent Secretary of the Ministry of Health - Mr. A. M. Abdullahi.
The Director-General of NAFDAC - Mojisola Christianah Adeyeye
Standard Organization of Nigeria (SON) - Barr. Aboloma Osita
National Institute for Pharmaceutical Research and Development (NIPRD)
The chairman of the Pharmacists Council of Nigeria (PCN) - Elijah Mohammed
The chairman of the National Drug Law Enforcement Agency (NDLEA) - Muhammad Abdallah
Representative of the  Pharmaceutical Manufacturing Group of Manufacturers Association of Nigeria - Okey Akpa
Representative of the Food and Beverage Group of Manufacturers Association of Nigeria - Anegbe Patrick
 Tukur S. Fada Tambuwal –    Member
 Mufutau Bolaji Yahaya –    Member
 Opeyemi Bamidele –    Member
Three people from the general public are also represented on the council.

Several units make up NAFDAC which includes:
The Legal unit is charged with offering legal advice on “law arising from Employee-Employer relationship and is the custodian of legal documents and all agreements relating to the Agency."
The Public Relations unit is headed by the director-general’s office. Its main function is to inform, sensitize, enlighten and create awareness concerning the role of the Agency. The agency is divided into eight directorates with the last two newly added.
Internal Audit provides a means of measuring the effectiveness of the system of internal control and accounting, and carries out special investigations.

Functions  

NAFDAC has various basic functions. According to the requirements of its enabling decree, the Agency was authorized to:
Regulate and control the importation, exportation, manufacture, advertisement, distribution, sale and use of drugs, cosmetics, medical devices, packaged water and chemicals
Conduct appropriate tests, ensure compliance with standard specifications designated and approved by the council for the effective control of quality of food, drugs, cosmetics, medical devices, packaged water, and chemicals.
Undertake appropriate investigation into the production premises and raw materials for food, drugs, cosmetics, medical devices, bottled water and chemicals and establish a relevant quality assurance system, including certification of the production sites and of the regulated products.
Undertake inspection of imported foods, drugs, cosmetics, medical devices, bottled water, and chemicals and establish a relevant quality assurance system, including certification of the production sites and of the regulated products.
Compile standard specifications, regulations, and guidelines for the production, importation, exportation, sale and distribution of food, drugs, cosmetics, medical devices, bottled water, and chemicals.
Undertake the registration of food, drugs, medical devices, bottled water and chemicals.
Control the exportation and issue quality certification of food, drugs, medical devices, bottled water and chemicals intended for export.
Establish and maintain relevant laboratories or other institutions in strategic areas of Nigeria as may be necessary for the performance of its functions.

NAFDAC envisions that by making these functions known, that its actions will be apparent “in all sectors that deal with food, cosmetics, medical devices, bottled water, and chemicals to the extent of instilling extra need for caution and compulsion to respect and obey existing regulations both for healthy, living and knowledge of certain sanctions or default.Despite the establishment of NAFDAC, the sale and use of fake drugs did not end.

New amendments since 2001 
Dissatisfied with progress in combating fake drugs, President Olusegun Obasanjo's administration dissolved the management of NAFDAC in August 2000. In April 2001, a new management team, with Dora Akunyili as director-general, was inaugurated. The team re-organized the agency, which has been successful in the recent past due to three new federal policies:
The outright ban on the importation of drugs and other regulated products through land borders.
The designation of Calabar and Apapa sea ports, Murtala Muhammed and Mallam Aminu Kano International Airports as exclusive ports of entry for the importation of drugs and pharmaceutical raw materials.
Release of shipping and cargo manifests by the Nigerian Ports Authority, shipping lines and airlines to NAFDAC inspectors. For several years, Nigeria was drowned in an ocean of fake drugs. Then “Dora Akunyili approached her job with zeal in order to rid the Nigerian drug market of fake drugs and contaminated water sold as “pure water.”

Controversies
The activities of NAFDAC have been the subject of considerable scrutiny in recent years. The agency has drawn fire for being susceptible to overt government interference, subject to bribery, internal feuding and constant rumours and or allegations abound concerning misappropriation of funds. In one high-profile (and typical) case, the former NAFDAC director of finance and accounts, Andrew Ademola Mogbojuri, alleged mass fraud in 2015 against the agency's director-general, Paul Orhii. The agency claimed sour grapes was behind the allegation and labelled Mogbojuri's claim "misleading and cheap blackmail".

Orhii was also the subject of a sweeping fraud allegation by NAFDAC whistleblowers earlier in 2015. A petition was sent to Nigerian President Muhammadu Buhari, alleging frivolous contract awards and supplies, manipulated publicity efforts, donations and international air travel racketeering.

Some of the world's largest brewers have been caught up in NAFDAC scandals as well. From a 2013 report alleging bribery conducted by Guinness and Heineken:Two multinational beer companies (Guinness and Heineken) have decided to do it the illegal way, which insiders alleged is to bribe officials of National Agency for Food and Drugs Administration Control (NAFDAC) to deny the manufacturers of local herbal gin accreditation, knowing that Nigerians who had been patronizing them will desist once they are not accredited by the agency. The bribes amount to millions of Naira.Guinness was back in the NAFDAC glare in 2016. Having been fined about ₦1 billion in November 2015 for allegedly re-validating and using expired raw materials without prior approval, the multinational brewer responded with a lawsuit, which was quietly dropped in March 2016.

Stakeholders
NAFDAC ensures it maintains very close contact with a number of national and international organizations whose activities relate to the functions of NAFDAC. Such Organizations include the following.
Consumer Protection Council of Nigeria(CPC)
Standards Organisation of Nigeria (SON)
National Drug Law Enforcement Agency (NDLEA)
National Institute for Pharmaceutical Research and Development (NIPRD)
Pharmacists Council of Nigeria (PCN)
Pharmaceutical Manufacturers Group of Manufactures Association of Nigeria (PMG-MAN)
Consumer Association of Nigeria
Institute of Public Analysts of Nigeria (IPAN)
Pharmaceutical Society of Nigeria (PSN)
Association of Food, Beverage and Tobacco Employees of Nigeria (AFBTE)
National Association of Government Approved Freight Forwarders (NAGAFF)
Association of Nigeria Custom Licensed Agents (ANCLA)
Patent and Proprietary Medicine Dealers Association (PPMDA)
National Union of Road Transport Workers (NURTW)
National Association of Road Transport Owners (NARTO)

In order to keep in touch with the international scene for information, training, co-operation assistance, aid and for financing of specific projects, especially in these days of global and national austerity, the agency maintains close relationship with a number of international agencies some of which include: 
United Nations International Drug Control Programme (UNDCP)
World Health Organization (WHO)
Codex Alimentarius Commission of Food and Agriculture Organization (CACFAO)
United States Food and Drug Administration (USFDA)
Environmental and Occupational Health Science Institute (EOHSI).

See also
Dora Akunyili
Mojisola Adeyeye
 RxNigeria.com  - An online database of pharmaceuticals and allied products approved for use in Nigeria by NAFDAC.

External links

 NAFDAC Official website
FAAN Carrier Portal

References

Food safety organizations
National agencies for drug regulation (Nigeria)
Medical and health organizations based in Nigeria
Nigeria articles needing expert attention
Food safety in Nigeria
Regulation in Nigeria